Vasco Manuel Vilhena Faísca Teixeira (born 27 August 1980), known as Faísca, is a Portuguese former footballer who played as a defender, currently a manager.

He spent the vast majority of his professional career in Italy after starting out at Sporting CP, representing in the country Vicenza, Padova and Ascoli and appearing in one Serie A match with the first club.

Playing career

Club
Born in Lisbon, Faísca was a product of Sporting CP's youth system. In the summer of 2000 he was signed by Inter Milan alongside teammates Marco Caneira and Paulo Costa, in co-ownership with other clubs; he was sold to Vicenza Calcio for 1,200 million lire (€619,748).

Faísca stayed in Italy and played with Vicenza Calcio for four seasons – one game in Serie A in 2000–01, the rest of his spell in Serie B– before his rights were acquired fully in June 2004. Shortly after, however, he returned to Portugal and joined Académica de Coimbra, making his Primeira Liga debut and being first choice (only two matches missed) as the Students narrowly avoided relegation.

In the 2005 off-season, Faísca signed for C.F. Os Belenenses, being fairly used in his first year but being deemed surplus to requirements soon afterwards. He returned to Italy in January 2007, joining Serie C1 team Calcio Padova and winning promotion in his second full campaign.

On 31 August 2010, Faísca moved to second-tier Ascoli Calcio 1898 as part of the deal that involved Jonas Portin. He suffered relegation at the end of 2012–13, terminating his contract which still had another year running.

Until his retirement at the age of 37, and save for one year in the Super League Greece with Platanias FC, Faísca competed in the Italian lower leagues, where he represented S.S. Matera Calcio, S.S. Maceratese 1922 and Virtus Francavilla Calcio.

International
Faísca appeared for the Portugal under-21 team at the 2002 UEFA European Championship in Switzerland, playing all group games as starter as the nation exited in that stage.

Coaching career
After a spell with SC Vianense's youths, Faísca started his senior managerial career as an assistant at U.D. Vilafranquense. On 5 February 2019, was named head coach of S.C. Olhanense in the third tier, and lost 1–0 on his debut away to Real S.C. five days later.

On 27 December 2019, Faísca was confirmed at S.C. Braga B, second-placed in the same league, on a deal until the summer of 2022; he replaced Rúben Amorim, who was promoted to the first team. He left a year early for F.C. Alverca, where he won two and lost three of six games before exiting by mutual consent on 4 October 2021.

Faísca returned to the Algarve on 22 December 2021, signing with S.C. Farense who were second from bottom. His Liga Portugal 2 debut came the following 17 January in a 1–0 home loss to Leixões SC; in April, with the side safe from relegation, he signed for another season with a buyout clause of €1.5 million.

On 3 February 2023, Faísca was dismissed by Farense after failing to reach an agreement to leave, despite his team being in second place. His exit was announced one hour before the match against C.F. Estrela da Amadora, who were one point behind.

References

External links

1980 births
Living people
Portuguese footballers
Footballers from Lisbon
Association football defenders
Primeira Liga players
Sporting CP footballers
Associação Académica de Coimbra – O.A.F. players
C.F. Os Belenenses players
Serie A players
Serie B players
Serie C players
L.R. Vicenza players
Calcio Padova players
Ascoli Calcio 1898 F.C. players
S.S. Maceratese 1922 players
Virtus Francavilla Calcio players
Super League Greece players
Platanias F.C. players
Portugal youth international footballers
Portugal under-21 international footballers
Portuguese expatriate footballers
Expatriate footballers in Italy
Expatriate footballers in Greece
Portuguese expatriate sportspeople in Italy
Portuguese expatriate sportspeople in Greece
Portuguese football managers
Liga Portugal 2 managers
S.C. Olhanense managers
S.C. Farense managers